The American Horse Council (AHC) is a trade organization in Washington, DC representing the horse industry.  The organization formed in the late 1960s, and received IRS 501(c) non-profit recognition in 1969,  with a committee  that became the Coalition of State Horse Councils forming in 1970, now having 43 states participating. American Horse Council Foundation was founded in 1991.
It lobbies before Congress and Federal agencies for the interests of the horse industry, and serves as a unified voice for the horse industry.

Membership is open to anyone, but is primarily made up of the following groups:
 Horse Councils of individual states; 
 breed organizations; 
 horse breeders;
 farriers;
 veterinarians;
 horse owners;
 rodeos;
 race tracks;
 horse industry businesses;
 individuals.

A subcommittee of the American Horse Council, the State Horse Councils Advisory Committee (SHCAC), is made up of representatives of the individual state horse councils, and works on equine issues at the state level, dealing with state legislation, trails & show facilities, state horse expos, etc.

Van Ness Award
This committee annually presents the Van Ness Award, given in honor and memory of Marjorie Van Ness of New Jersey, a long-time leader and friend to the entire horse industry.  This award is presented to an individual that best emulates the dedication and commitment of Marge Van Ness to the improvement of the horse industry at the state level.  Past recipients have been:

References

External links

State Horse Councils Advisory Committee website

Equestrian organizations
Trade associations based in the United States
Organizations established in 1991
1991 establishments in the United States
Organizations established in 1969
1969 establishments in the United States